Kappa Scorpii, Latinized from κ Scorpii, is a binary star system in the southern constellation of Scorpius. With an apparent visual magnitude of 2.4, this star system is readily visible to the naked eye.

Properties
This is a spectroscopic binary, which is a type of binary star system in which the two stars are so close together that they have not been individually resolved with a telescope. The pair orbit each other with a period of about 196 days and an eccentricity of nearly 0.5. The combined spectrum of this pair matches a star with a stellar classification of B1.5 III. The 'III' luminosity class indicates the presence of a giant star that has exhausted the supply of hydrogen at its core and is in a late evolutionary stage.

The primary component of the pair, κ Sco A, is a variable star of Beta Cephei type. It is undergoing radial pulsations with a dominant frequency of 4.99922 cycles per day, or 4.8 hours per cycle. There are overlapping secondary pulsation frequencies of about 4.85 and 5.69 cycles per day. This star has about 17 times the mass of the Sun and is nearly 7 times the Sun's radius. The effective temperature of the outer envelope is 23,400 K, giving it a blue-white hue. It is rotating rapidly, with an estimated period of only 1.9 days and an axis of rotation that is inclined by about 40° to the line of sight from the Earth.

The secondary component, κ Sco B, is smaller than the primary, but still much larger than the Sun. It has about 12 times the mass of the Sun and nearly six times the Sun's radius. The effective temperature of 18,800 K is also higher than the Sun's, which is at 5,778 K.

Traditional name
κ Scorpii has been called Girtab , which is the Sumerian word for 'scorpion'. The name has survived through the Babylonian star catalogues, and was originally applied to an asterism comprising this star, Lambda Scorpii, Upsilon Scorpii, and Iota Scorpii.

Modern legacy
κ Scorpii appears on the  flag of Brazil, symbolising the state of Paraíba.

References

External links

Scorpius (constellation)
Scorpii, Kappa
B-type giants
Spectroscopic binaries
Beta Cephei variables
Girtab
086670
6580
160578
CD-38 12137